Ian Lorello (born May 7, 1990) is an American former competitive ice dancer. With Isabella Cannuscio, he is the 2011 Ice Challenge silver medalist and the 2010 U.S. national junior pewter medalist. They competed at three Grand Prix events and won two bronze medals on the ISU Junior Grand Prix series. They announced the end of their partnership in March 2012.

Ian's elder brother, Alexander, placed 12th in ice dancing at the 2009 U.S. Championships. His younger siblings, Grant and Meara, won medals in ice dancing at the 2011 U.S. Junior Championships.

Programs 
(with Cannuscio)

Competitive highlights 
GP: Grand Prix; JGP: Junior Grand Prix

(with Cannuscio)

References

External links 

 
 Official website of Isabella Cannuscio / Ian Lorello at ice-dance.com

American male ice dancers
1990 births
Living people
People from Romeoville, Illinois
Dancers from Illinois